The Utah Governor's Medal for Science and Technology is the highest civilian award bestowed by the U.S. state of Utah in those fields. It is awarded in the five categories of academia, science education, industry, government, and a special category. The award was initiated in 1987 and is sponsored by the Utah Science and Technology Research Initiative and the Governor’s Office of Economic Development. Nominations are reviewed by the Utah State Science Advisory Council before being presented to the governor.

Award winners

1980s
1987
Academia:
Del Allen, Brigham Young University
Sidney R. Ash, Weber State College
Wilford Hansen, Utah State University
Eugene Loh, University of Utah
James Mac Mahon, Utah State University
William Odell, University of Utah
Robert W. Parry, University of Utah
Richard Riesenfeld, University of Utah
John Roth, University of Utah
L. Douglas Smoot, Brigham Young University
Milton E. Wadsworth, University of Utah 
Homer Walker, Utah State University

Education:
Richard Dix Cloward, Bonneville High School
Shu Ming Chang, Clearfield High School
Wade W. Gleary, Davis High School
Rachelle Argyle, Park City High School
Wendy Hendrickson, Richfield High School

Industry:
David Evans, Evans & Sutherland
Milton Lee, Lee Scientific
Michael Alder, NPI
Benjamin V. Cox, Unisys
Wayne Brown, Utah Innovation Center

1988
Academia:
Douglas Chabries, Brigham Young University
Eldon Gardner, Utah State University
William J. Higuchi University of Utah
Jack Keller, Utah State University
Sung Wan Kim, University of Utah
Carl D. Marti, Jr. Weber State College
Don Olsen, University of Utah
Robert W. Schunk, Utah State University
Robert W. Sidwell, Utah State University

Education:
Rober Cefalo, Box Elder High School
RuthAnn Yahne, Layton High School
David G. Rettie, Olympus High School
Linda Jean Preston, Park City High School
Merrill Webb, Provo High School

Industry:
Alan Ashton, WordPerfect

1989
Academia:
James W. Cronin, University of Utah
Doran J. Baker, Utah State University
Dean F. Peterson, Jr., Utah State University

Education:
Pamela P. Giles, Brighton High School
Gerald B. Lord, Granger High School

Industry:
Robert A. Schumacker, Evans & Sutherland
Aaron W. Farr, Jetway Systems
Ronald K. Bell, Unisys

1990s
1990
Academia:
John A. Dixon, University of Utah
Reed M. Izatt, Brigham Young University
Stephen Jacobsen, University of Utah
Fritz Luty, University of Utah
Cyrus M. Mckell, Weber State College
Ronald Ragsdale, University of Utah
John Paul Riley, Utah State University

Education:
Dwight O. Brown, Bountiful High School
John W. Barainca, Brighton High School
Michael B. Harris, Layton High School

Industry:
Allan Steed, Space Dynamics Laboratory
William Partridge, Technical Research Associates, Inc.

1991
Academia:
Jerald Bradshaw, Brigham Young University
J. Calvin Giddings, University of Utah
Douglas James, Utah State University
Verlaine McPhie, Salt Lake Community College
Gilbert Moore, Utah State University
Baldomero Olivera, University of Utah
Frank Redd, Utah State University

Education:
Marcie Wolfe, Mt. Ogden Middle School

Government:
Gene Amman, United States Forest Service

Industry:
Ruth Novak, Hercules Inc.

1992
Academia:
Joseph Andrade, University of Utah
A. Bruce Bishop, Utah State University
Karin Caldwell, University of Utah
David M. Grant, University of Utah
Levi Hintze, Brigham Young University
Bartell Jensen, Utah State University
J. Bevan Ott, Brigham Young University
Edward B. Walker, Weber State University

Education:
Jan Vander Hooft, Brighton High School
Larry Larson, North Cache Middle School
Vern W. Bangerter, Timpview High School

Industry:
Homer R. Warner, American College of Medical Informatics
J.D. Mortensen, Midmid, Inc.
Ray Noorda, Novell, Inc.

1993
Academia:
K. L. DeVries, University of Utah
Helga E. T. Kolb, University of Utah
Ronald Sims, Utah State University
Peter Stang, University of Utah
Raymond L. White, University of Utah

Education:
Larry J. Peterson, Bonneville High School
LaMont Jensen, Clearfield High School

Government:
Hellmut H. Doelling, Utah Geological Survey

Industry:
J. McKay Anderson, Hercules, Inc.
O. Lew Wood, Quartztronics, Inc.
Raymond J. Ganowsky, Ram Company

1994
Academia:
Tracy Hall, Brigham Young University
Raymond Gesteland, University of Utah
Sherman Coleman, University of Utah
William Lee Stokes, University of Utah
Linda Powers, Utah State University

Education:
Ty Robinson, Spanish Fork Intermediate

Government:
Kevin T. Jones, Division of Utah State History

Industry:
Keith Wilson, Dynix
Errol P. EerNisse, Quartztronics

1995
Academia:
Peter F. Gerity, Utah State University
David W. Pershing, University of Utah
C. Dale Poulter, University of Utah
Thomas G. Stockham, University of Utah

Education:
Sherman Dickman, Salt Lake City School District

Government:
Charles B. Hunt, U.S. Geological Survey

Industry:
Mark Skolnick, Myriad Genetics

1996
Academia:
C. Anthon Ernstrom, Utah State University
Richard A. Normann, University of Utah
Morris Robbins, Brigham Young University

Education:
Walter Saunders, Utah State University

Government:
Von Del Chamberlain, Hansen Planetarium
Walter Arabasz, University of Utah

Industry:
Dinesh Patel, TheraTech, Inc.
Harold Ritchey, Thiokol
Laurence Reaveley, University of Utah

1997
Academia
Gerald B. Stringfellow, University of Utah

Education:
Rose Marie Voce, Jackson Elementary

Industry:
Bryant F. Anderson, Lockheed Martin
Peter Meldrum, Myriad Genetics
Dan Fischer, Ultradent Products, Inc.

1998
Academia:
John O. Evans, Utah State University
Spotswood Spruance, University of Utah

Education:
Joseph Hugh Baird, Brigham Young University
Duane Merrell, Emery High School

Government:
David Madsen, Utah Geological Survey

Industry:
David Burt, Space Dynamics Laboratory

1999
Academia:
Christopher R. Johnson, University of Utah
James Ehleringer, University of Utah
Stephen M. Prescott, University of Utah
Marvin N. Tolman, Brigham Young University ED
Don Carl Smellie, Utah State University   ED

Government:
Eva C. Nieminski, Utah Department of Environmental Quality
Alan J. Mohr, Dugway Proving Grounds
Bruce Barrett, U.S. Bureau of Reclamation

Industry:
Robert F. Keller, Alliant Techsystems
Marlin Shelley, Cirris Systems Corporation

2000s
2000
Academia:
Thomas Henderson, University of Utah
William Carroll, University of Utah
Gary Belovsky, Utah State University

Education:
Richard Tolman, Brigham Young University
Donald Burge, College of Eastern Utah
Donald Jensen, Utah State University

Government:
James Kohler, Bureau of Land Management
Stanley Perkes, Bureau of Land Management
James Bowers, Dugway Proving Grounds
Suzanne Winters, The Escalante Center

Industry:
Gilson Newman Bingham Team: Bradley S. Gilson, Mark Newman, Judd Lawrence, Scott Hill
James Boye, Varian Medical Systems

2001
Academia:
Mary Beckerle, University of Utah
Gail Bingham, Utah State University

Education:
Janet Ross, Four Corners School

Government:
Doyle Stephens, US Geological Survey

Industry:
Bob Randolph, Alliant Techsystems

2002
Academia:
Steven D. Aust, Utah State University
Randall W. Burt, University of Utah
Om P. Gandhi, University of Utah

Industry:
Larry J. Ashton, Rocky Mountain Composites, Inc.
Hunter Jackson, NPS Pharmaceuticals
Bill Jordan Pope, Diamicron, Inc.

Education:
Kathleen P. Ochsenbein, Roy Junior High School

Special:
Mario Capecchi, University of Utah

2003
Academia:
Clair Batty, Utah State University
David Bowles, Utah State University
Carl Wittwer, University of Utah

Education:
Virgina Ord, Davis School District
William Smith, Granite School District

Government:
Jerry Miller, US Bureau of Reclamation
Brett Moulding, Utah State Office of Education

Industry:
Fred Lampropoulos, Merit Medical Systems, Inc.
Ashok Joshi,  Ceramatec, Inc.

2004
Academia:
A. Lorris Betz, University of Utah 
Noelle E. Cockett, Utah State University
Karl Gordon Lark, University of Utah 
Joel S. Miller, University of Utah
C. Arden Pope, Brigham Young University
Wynn R. Walker, Utah State University

Education:
Richard Halterman, Granite School District

Government:
Michael Glass, Dugway Proving Ground

Industry:
Stephen R. Carter, Novell, Inc.

Special:
Rex S. Spendlove, HyClone

2005
Academia:
David W. Hoeppner, University of Utah
Daniel L. Simmons, Brigham Young University
Z. Valy Vardeny, University of Utah

Education
Barbara Gentry, Jordan School District
Donna Lee Trease, Davis County School District

Government:
Loren Morton, Utah Department of Environmental Quality

Industry:
Dean Lester, ATK Thiokol
James LeVoy Sorenson, Sorenson Companies

Special:
Richard K. Koehn, SentrX Surgical, Inc.
Richard W. Grow, University of Utah

2006
Academia:
Merrill W. Beckstead, Brigham Young University
Jan D. Miller, University of Utah
Pierre Sokolsky, University of Utah
Anil Virkar, University of Utah

Education:
Gina Sanzenbacher, Jordan Applied Technology Center

Government:
Theron Miller, Utah Department of Environmental Quality

Industry:
Glenn D. Prestwich, Carbylan BioSurgery, Inc.

2007
Academia:
Chris Ireland, University of Utah
Thomas Wilkerson, Utah State University
Bonnie Baxter, Westminster College

Education:
Paul Nance, Jordan School District

Government:
Greg Jones, Moran Eye Center

Industry:
Jerry R. Nelson, Nelson Laboratories, Inc.
Josh James, Omniture

Special:
Jack Sunderlage, ContentWatch

2008
Academia:
Brent Adams, Brigham Young University
David S. Chapman, University of Utah

Education:
Lee Siegel, University of Utah
Bonnie Bourgeous, Clearfield High School
Vickie Ahlstrom, Sego Lily Elementary

Industry:
H. Dewayne Ashmead, Albion Laboratories, Inc.

Government:
David Wakefield, Utah Department of Public Safety/Forensic Services

Special:
Mario Capecchi, University of Utah

2009
Academia:
Randall J. Olsen, Moran Eye Center

Education:
W. Farrell Edwards, Utah State University
Glen Westbroek, Alpine School District
National Library of Virtual Manipulatives, Utah State University

Industry:
Ashok C. Khandkar, Amedica Corp
Reaveley Engineers & Associates

Government:
William R. Lund, Utah Geological Survey

2010s
2010
Academia:
Paul Israelsen, Utah State University
Peter B. Armentrout, University of Utah

Education:
Louisa Stark, Genetic Science Learning Center
Doug Panee, Oak Canyon Jr. High

Industry:
Dennis Farrar, Upstart Ventures
D. Clark Turner, Aribex, Inc

Government:
Kevin Jensen, Forage & Range Research Lab

2011
Academia:
Byard D. Wood, Utah State University
Bruce Bugbee, Utah State University
Edward M. Eyring, University of Utah

Education:
Hugo Rossi, University of Utah

Industry:
Tim Miller, Echelon Biosciences
Kelly B. Powers, CR Bard Access Systems

Government:
Amanda Smith, Department of Environmental Quality

Special:
Richard R. Nelson, Utah Technology Council
Gary Harter, Governor's Office of Economic Development
Jeff Edwards, EDCUtah
Steve Rodgers, EmergenTek

2012
Academia:
David Kieda, University of Utah 
Geraldine Mineau University of Utah
Thure E. Cerling, University of Utah

Education:
Adam Johnston, Weber State University
Amy Pace, Open High School of Utah

Industry:
Dale Taylor, Ceramics Material Technologies
Theodore Stanley, Anesta and ZARS

Government:
Ted McAleer, USTAR
Nicole Toomey Davis, Enclavix, LLC

Scott Anderson, Zions Bank

2013
Academia:
Henry S. White, University of Utah   ACA
Kenneth L. White, Utah State University   ACA

Education:
Aloysius S. Church, University of Utah

Industry:
IM Flash Technologies
Larry Grandia, Health Catalyst
Larry Rigby, Larada Sciences

Government:
Tamara Goetz, Utah Valley University

2014
Academia:
Phyllis Coley, University of Utah
Erik Jorgensen, University of Utah

Education:
Christine Celestino, Juan Diego Catholic High School
Helen Hu, Westminster College

Industry:
Niel Holt, Space Dynamics Laboratory
Ronald Weiss, ARUP Laboratories
US Synthetic

Special:
Troy D’Ambrosio, University of Utah

2015
Academia:
Noelle E. Cockett, Utah State University
Joel Harris, University of Utah

Education:
Michelle Baker, Utah State University
Christine Hailey, Utah State University
Richard B. Brown, University of Utah
Paul Hill, Utah State University

Industry:
Susan Opp, L-3 Communications
Rich Linder, CoNextions Medical
Nelson Laboratories

Special:
Sarah George, University of Utah
Tom Parks, University of Utah

2016
Academia:
Cynthia Burrows, University of Utah
Cynthia Furse,  University of Utah
Timothy McLain, Brigham Young University
Terry Messmer, Utah State University
John Morrey, Utah State University
Kyle Rollins, Brigham Young University

Education:
Debra Spielmaker, Utah State University
Adam Beehler,  University of Utah

Industry:
ENVE Composites
Lawrence Thatcher, The Thatcher Company

Government:
Robert Baskin, US Geological Survey

Special:
Vivian S. Lee,  University of Utah

External links
Governors Medals for Science and Technology winners

References

Awards established in 1987
1987 establishments in Utah
Government of Utah
State awards and decorations of the United States
Utah culture
Science and technology in Utah